Protestantism and Islam entered into contact during the early-16th century when the Ottoman Empire, expanding in the Balkans, first encountered Calvinist Protestants in present-day Hungary and Transylvania. As both parties opposed the Austrian Holy Roman Emperor and his Roman Catholic allies, numerous exchanges occurred, exploring religious similarities and the possibility of trade and military alliances.

The early Protestants and Islam established a sense of mutual tolerance and understanding, despite theological differences on Christology, considering each other to be closer to one another than to Catholicism. The Ottoman Empire supported the early Protestant churches and contributed to their survival in dire times. Martin Luther regarded the Ottomans as allies against the papacy, considering them the "rod of God's wrath against Europe's sins." The allegiances of the Ottoman Empire and threat of Ottoman expansion in Eastern Europe pressured King Charles V to sign the Peace of Nuremberg with the Protestant princes, accept the Peace of Passau, and the Peace of Augsburg, formally recognizing Protestantism in Germany and ending military threats to their existence.

Introduction

Protestantism is a branch of the monotheistic Christian religion which originated in Europe in the early 16th century. It adheres doctrinally to the doctrine of the Holy Trinity and other theological doctrines of the Catholic Church and the Eastern Orthodox Church, but split from the Western (Roman) Catholic Church as a "Protest" against ecclesiastical corruption, pastoral abuses and certain doctrines of the Roman Catholic Church. Protestantism itself had multiple variations from the start, specifically among followers of Martin Luther, John Calvin, Huldrych Zwingli and later, Thomas Cranmer.

Islam is a monotheistic religion, arising around 600 AD, that considers itself the final authentic practice of the faith of the patriarch Abraham.  While it is Abrahamic, it presents views of Jewish scripture (the Tanakh) and of Jesus that are incompatible with Judaism and Christianity, respectively.

The subject of this page is to consider the historical political, military, and cultural/religious interactions of Protestant and Islamic rulers.

The bulk of this page examines a hypothesis that Protestant states and the Islamic Turkish state acted to align themselves based on various common interests.  One aspect of this hypothesis posits that, in the 16th and 17th centuries, Turkish and Protestant rulers shared a common geopolitical opposition to the Roman Catholic Holy Roman Empire, and tensions with France and Spain, the other large Roman Catholic states, and that this common interest gave rise to alignment in political and military alliances. It is also discussed whether Protestantism and Islam aligned theologically on iconoclasm, and, culturally—in terms of the religiously-motivated cultural mores of that era – in opposition to the person or office of the Roman Catholic Pope.

Historical background
Protestantism and Islam entered into contact during the 16th century when Calvinist Protestants in present-day Hungary and Transylvania coincided with the expansion of the Ottoman Empire in the Balkans. As Protestantism is divided into a few distinguishable branches and multiple denominations within the former, it is hard to determine the relations specifically. Many of these denominations can have a different approachment to this matter. Islam is divided as well into various denominations. This article focuses on Protestant-Muslim relations, but should be taken with caution.

Relations became more adversarial in the early modern and modern periods, although recent attempts have been made at rapprochement. In terms of comparative religion, there are interesting similarities especially with the Sunni, while Catholics are often noted for similarities with Shias, as well as differences, in both religious approaches.

Following the Ottoman conquest of Constantinople in 1453 by Mehmed the Conqueror and the unification of the Middle East under Selim I and his son Suleiman the Magnificent managed to expand Ottoman rule into Central Europe. The Habsburg Empire thus entered into direct conflict with the Ottomans.

At the same time the Protestant Reformation was taking place in numerous areas of northern and central Europe, in harsh opposition to Papal authority and the Holy Roman Empire led by Emperor Charles V. This situation led the Protestants to consider various forms of cooperation and rapprochement (religious, commercial, military) with the Muslim world, in opposition to their common Habsburg enemy.

Early religious accommodation (15th–17th centuries)

During the development of the Reformation, Protestantism and Islam were considered closer to each other than they were to Catholicism: "Islam was seen as closer to Protestantism in banning images from places of worship, in not treating marriage as a sacrament and in rejecting monastic orders".. The dispute between Catholics and Protestants in a divided Europe opened the way for Islam to become a field of battle.

Mutual tolerance
The Sultan of the Ottoman Empire was known for his tolerance of the Christian and Jewish faiths within his dominions, whereas the King of Spain did not tolerate the Protestant faith. The Ottoman Empire was indeed known at that time for its religious tolerance. Various religious refugees, such as the Huguenots, some Anglicans, Quakers, Anabaptists or even Jesuits or Capuchins were able to find refuge at Istanbul and in the Ottoman Empire, where they were given right of residence and worship. Further, the Ottomans supported the Calvinists in Transylvania and Hungary but also in France. The contemporary French thinker Jean Bodin wrote:

Martin Luther, in his 1528 pamphlet, On War against the Turk, calls for the Germans to resist the Ottoman invasion of Europe, as the catastrophic Siege of Vienna was lurking, but expressed views of Islam which, compared to his aggressive speech against Catholicism (and later Judaism), are relatively mild. Concerned with his personal preaching on divine atonement and Christian justification, he extensively criticized the principles of Islam as utterly despicable and blasphemous, considering Qu'ran as void of any tract of divine truth. For Luther, it was mandatory to let the Qu'ran "speak for itself" as means to show what Christianity saw as a draft from prophetic and apostolic teaching, therefore allowing a proper Christian response. His knowledge on the subject was based on a medieval polemicist version of the Qu'ran made by Riccoldo da Monte di Croce, which was the European scholarly reference of the subject. In 1542, while Luther was translating Riccoldo's Refutation of the Koran, which would become the first version of Koranic material in German, he wrote a letter to Basle's city council to relieve the ban on Theodore Bibliander's translation of the Qu'ran into Latin. Mostly due to his letter, Bibliander's translation was finally allowed and eventually published in 1543, with a preface made by Martin Luther himself. With access to a more accurate translation of the Qu'ran, Luther understood some of Riccoldo's critiques to be partial, but nevertheless concurred with virtually all of them.

As a religious profession, however, Luther felt the same sense of tolerance for freedom of conscience to be given to Islam as to other faiths of its time:

However, this statement mentions "Turks", and it is not clear whether the meaning was of "Turks" as a representation of the specific rule of the Ottoman Empire, or as a representation of Islam in general.

Martin Luther's reasoning also appears in one of his other comments, in which he said that "A smart Turk makes a better ruler than a dumb Christian".

Efforts at doctrinal rapprochement

Martin Luther also took note of the similarities between Islam and Protestantism in the rejection of idols, although he noted Islam was much more drastic in its complete rejection of images. In On War against the Turk, Luther is actually less critical of the Turks than he is of the Pope, whom he calls an anti-Christ, or the Jews, whom he describes as "the Devil incarnate". He urges his contemporaries to also see the good aspects in the Turks, and refers to some who were favourable to the Ottoman Empire, and "who actually want the Turk to come and rule, because they think that our German people are wild and uncivilized - indeed that they are half-devil and half-man".

The Ottomans also felt closer to the Protestants than to the Catholics. At one point, a letter was sent from Suleiman the Magnificent to the "Lutherans" in Flanders, claiming that he felt close to them, "since they did not worship idols, believed in one God and fought against the Pope and Emperor".

This notion of religious similarities was again taken up in epistolary exchanges between Elizabeth I of England and Sultan Murad III. In one correspondence, Murad entertained the notion that Islam and Protestantism had "much more in common than either did with Roman Catholicism, as both rejected the worship of idols", and argued for an alliance between England and the Ottoman Empire.

In a 1574 letter to the "Members of the Lutheran sect in Flanders and Spain", Murad III made considerable efforts to highlight the similarities between Islamic and Protestants principles. He wrote:

Such claims seem to have been politically inspired as well, with the Ottomans trying to establish religious common ground as a way to secure a political alliance. Elizabeth I herself however made efforts to adjust her own religious rhetoric in order to minimize differences with the Ottomans and facilitate relations. In her correspondence with Murad, she stresses the monotheism and the anti-idolatry of her religion, by uniquely describing herself as:

Military collaboration

Military cooperation between the Ottoman Empire and European powers started in earnest with the Franco-Ottoman alliance of 1535. The alliance provided strategic support to, and effectively protected, the kingdom of France from the ambitions of Charles V. It also gave the opportunity for the Ottoman Empire to become involved in European diplomacy and gain prestige in its European dominions. Side effects included a lot of negative propaganda against the actions of France and its "unholy" alliance with a Muslim power. According to historian Arthur Hassall the consequences of the Franco-Ottoman alliance were far-reaching: "The Ottoman alliance had powerfully contributed to save France from the grasp of Charles V, it had certainly aided Protestantism in Germany, and from a French point of view, it had rescued the North German allies of Francis I."

Even after the 1571 Battle of Lepanto, Ottoman support for France would continue however, as well as support for the Dutch and the English after 1580, and support for Protestants and Calvinists, as a way to counter Habsburg attempts at supremacy in Europe. Various overtures were made by Ottoman rulers to the Protestants, who were also fighting against a common enemy, the Catholic House of Habsburg. Suleiman the Magnificent is known to have sent at least one letter to the "Lutherans" in Flanders, offering troops at the time they would request, Murad III is also known to have advocated to Elizabeth I an alliance between England and the Ottoman Empire.

Overall, the military activism of the Ottoman Empire on the southern European front probably was the reason why Lutheranism was able to survive in spite of the opposition of Charles V and reach recognition at the Peace of Augsburg in September 1555: "the consolidation, expansion and legitimization of Lutheranism in Germany by 1555 should be attributed to Ottoman imperialism more than to any other single factor".

The Dutch Revolt and Islam

Fundamentally, the Protestant Dutch had strong antagonisms to both the Catholics and the Muslims. In some cases however, alliances, or attempts at alliance between the Dutch and the Muslims were made possible, as when the Dutch allied with the Muslims of the Moluccas to oust the Portuguese, and the Dutch became rather tolerant of the Islamic religion in their colonial possessions after the final subjugation of Macassar in 1699.

During the Dutch Revolt, the Dutch were under such a desperate situation that they looked for help from every nationality, and "indeed even a Turk", as wrote the secretary of Jan van Nassau. The Dutch saw Ottoman successes against the Habsburgs with great interest, and saw Ottoman campaigns in the Mediterranean as an indicator of relief on the Dutch front. William wrote around 1565:

The Dutch looked expectantly at the development of the Siege of Malta (1565), hoping that the Ottomans "were in Valladolid already", and used it as a way to obtain concessions from the Spanish crown.

Contacts soon became more direct. William of Orange sent ambassadors to the Ottoman Empire for help in 1566. When no other European power would help, "the Dutch cause was offered active support, paradoxically enough, only by the Ottoman Turks". One of the Sultan principal advisers Joseph Miques, Duke of Naxos, delivered a letter to the Calvinists in Antwerp pledging that "the forces of the Ottomans would soon hit Philip II's affairs so hard that he would not even have the time to think of Flanders". The death of Suleiman the Magnificent later in 1566 however, meant that the Ottoman were unable to offer support for several years after. In 1568, William of Orange again sent a request to the Ottomans to attack Spain, without success. The 1566-1568 revolt of the Netherlands finally failed, largely due to the lack of foreign support.

In 1574, William of Orange and Charles IX of France, through his pro-Huguenot ambassador François de Noailles, Bishop of Dax, tried again to obtain the support of the Ottoman ruler Selim II. Selim II sent his support through a messenger, who endeavoured to put the Dutch in contact with the rebellious Moriscos of Spain and the pirates of Algiers. Selim also sent a great fleet which conquered Tunis in October 1574, thus succeeding in reducing Spanish pressure on the Dutch, and leading to negotiations at the Conference of Breda. After the death of Charles IX in May 1574 however, contacts weakened, although the Ottomans are said to have supported the 1575-1576 revolt, and establish a Consulate in Antwerp (De Griekse Natie). The Ottomans made a truce with Spain, and shifted their attention to their conflict with Persia, starting the long Ottoman–Safavid War (1578–1590).

The British author William Rainolds (1544–1594) wrote a pamphlet entitled "Calvino-Turcismus" in criticism of these rapprochements.

The phrase Liever Turks dan Paaps ("Rather a Turk than a Papist") was a Dutch slogan during the Dutch Revolt of the end of the 17th century. The slogan was used by the Dutch mercenary naval forces (the "Sea Beggars") in their fight against Catholic Spain. The banner of the Sea Beggars was also similar to that of the Turks, with a crescent on a red background. The phrase "Liever Turks dan Paaps" was coined as a way to express that life under the Ottoman Sultan would have been more desirable than life under the King of Spain. The Flemish noble D'Esquerdes wrote to this effect that he:

The slogan Liever Turks dan Paaps seems to have been largely rhetorical however, and the Dutch hardly contemplated life under the Sultan at all. Ultimately, the Turks were infidels, and the heresy of Islam alone disqualified them from assuming a more central (or consistent) role in the rebels' program of propaganda.

During the early 17th century the Dutch trading ports housed many Muslims, according to a Dutch traveler to Persia there would be no use in describing the Persians as "they are so numerous in Dutch cities". Dutch paintings from that time often show Turks, Persians and Jews strolling through the city. Officials that were sent to the Netherlands included Zeyn-Al-Din Beg of the Saffavid empire in 1607 and Ömer Aga of the Ottoman Empire in 1614. Like the Venetians en Genoese before them, the Dutch and English established a trade network in the eastern Mediterranean and had regular interactions with the ports of the Persian Gulf. Many Dutch painters even went to work in Isfahan, central Iran.

From 1608, Samuel Pallache served as an intermediary to discuss an alliance between Morocco and the Low Countries. In 1613, the Moroccan Ambassador Al-Hajari discussed in La Hague with the Dutch Prince Maurice of Orange the possibility of an alliance between the Dutch Republic, the Ottoman Empire, Morocco and the Moriscos, against the common enemy Spain. His book mentions the discussion for a combined offensive on Spain, as well as the religious reasons for the good relations between Islam and Protestantism at the time:

During the Thirty Years War (1618–1648), the Dutch would strengthen contacts with the Moriscos against Spain.

French Huguenots and Islam

French Huguenots were in contact with the Moriscos in plans against Spain in the 1570s. Around 1575, plans were made for a combined attack of Aragonese Moriscos and Huguenots from Béarn under Henri de Navarre against Spanish Aragon, in agreement with the king of Algiers and the Ottoman Empire, but these projects foundered with the arrival of John of Austria in Aragon and the disarmament of the Moriscos. In 1576, a three-pronged fleet from Constantinople was planned to disembark between Murcia and Valencia while the French Huguenots would invade from the north and the Moriscos accomplish their uprising, but the Ottoman fleet failed to arrive.

Alliance between the Barbary states and England

Following the sailing of The Lion of Thomas Wyndham in 1551, and the 1585 establishment of the English Barbary Company, trade developed between England and the Barbary states, and especially Morocco. Diplomatic relations and an alliance were established between Elizabeth and the Barbary states. England entered in a trading relationship with Morocco detrimental to Spain, selling armour, ammunition, timber, metal in exchange for Moroccan sugar, in spite of a Papal ban, prompting the Papal Nuncio in Spain to say of Elizabeth: "there is no evil that is not devised by that woman, who, it is perfectly plain, succoured Mulocco (Abd-el-Malek) with arms, and especially with artillery".

In 1600, Abd el-Ouahed ben Messaoud, the principal secretary to the Moroccan ruler Mulai Ahmad al-Mansur, visited England as an ambassador to the court of Queen Elizabeth I. Abd el-Ouahed ben Messaoud spent 6 months at the court of Elizabeth, in order to negotiate an alliance against Spain. The Moroccan ruler wanted the help of an English fleet to invade Spain, Elizabeth refused, but welcomed the embassy as a sign of insurance, and instead accepted to establish commercial agreements. Queen Elizabeth and king Ahmad continued to discuss various plans for combined military operations, with Elizabeth requesting a payment of 100,000 pounds in advance to king Ahmad for the supply of a fleet, and Ahmad asking for a tall ship to be sent to get the money. Elizabeth "agreed to sell munitions supplies to Morocco, and she and Mulai Ahmad al-Mansur talked on and off about mounting a joint operation against the Spanish". Discussions however remained inconclusive, and both rulers died within two years of the embassy.

Collaboration between the Ottoman Empire and England

Diplomatic relations were established with the Ottoman Empire during the reign of Elizabeth, with the chartering of the Levant Company and the dispatch of the first English ambassador to the Porte, William Harborne, in 1578. Numerous envoys were dispatched in both directions and epistolary exchanges occurred between Elizabeth and Sultan Murad III. In one correspondence, Murad entertained the notion that Islam and Protestantism had "much more in common than either did with Roman Catholicism, as both rejected the worship of idols", and argued for an alliance between England and the Ottoman Empire. To the dismay of Catholic Europe, England exported tin and lead (for cannon-casting) and ammunition to the Ottoman Empire, and Elizabeth seriously discussed joint military operations with Murad III during the outbreak of war with Spain in 1585, as Francis Walsingham was lobbying for a direct Ottoman military involvement against the common Spanish enemy.

English writers of the period often expressed admiration towards the "Turks" and the "Ottoman Empire", describing it as endowed with "Majestical and August form and features" and being the "Powerfullest nation in Europe", saying that the Turks were "the only modern people, great in action- he who would behold these times in their greatest glory, could not find a better scene than Turky" and that they had "incredible civility".

Anglo-Turkish piracy

After peace was made with Catholic Spain in 1604, English pirates nevertheless continued to raid Christian shipping in the Mediterranean, this time under the protection of the Muslim rulers of the Barbary States, and often converting to Islam in the process, in what has been described as Anglo-Turkish piracy.

Transylvania and Hungary

In eastern Central Europe, particularly in Transylvania, tolerant Ottoman rule meant that the Protestant communities there were protected from Catholic persecutions by the Habsburg. In the 16th century, the Ottomans supported the Calvinists in Transylvania and Hungary and practised religious toleration, giving almost complete freedom, although heavy taxation was imposed. Suleiman the Magnificent in particular supported John Sigismund of Hungary, allowing him to establish the Unitarian Church in Transylvania. By the end of the century, large parts of the population in Hungary thus became either Lutheran or Calvinist, to become the Reformed Church in Hungary.

In the 17th century, Protestant communities again asked for Ottoman help against the Habsburg Catholics. When in 1606 Emperor Rudolph II suppressed religious liberty, Prince István Bocskay (1558–1606) of Transylvania, allied with the Ottoman Turks, achieved autonomy for Transylvania, including guaranteeing religious freedom in the rest of Hungary for a short time. In 1620, the Transylvanian Protestant prince Bethlen Gabor, fearful of the Catholic policies of Ferdinand II, requested a protectorate by Sultan Osman II, so that "the Ottoman Empire became the one and only ally of great-power status which the rebellious Bohemian states could muster after they had shaken off Habsburg rule and had elected Frederick V as a Protestant king", Ambassadors were exchanged, with Heinrich Bitter visiting Istanbul in January 1620, and Mehmed Aga visiting Prague in July 1620. The Ottomans offered a force of 60,000 cavalry to Frederick and plans were made for an invasion of Poland with 400,000 troops in exchange for the payment of an annual tribute to the Sultan. The Ottomans defeated the Poles, which were supporting the Habsburgs in the Thirty Years' War, at the Battle of Cecora in September–October 1620, but were not able to further intervene efficiently before the Bohemian defeat at the Battle of the White Mountain in November 1620.

At the end of the century, the Hungarian leader Imre Thököly, in resistance to the anti-Protestant policies of the Habsburg, asked and obtained, the military help of the Ottoman Grand Vizier Kara Mustafa, leading to the 1683 Ottoman attack on the Habsburg Empire and the Battle of Vienna.

In the 16th century, Hungary had become almost entirely Protestant, with first Lutheranism, then soon afterwards Calvinism, but following the Habsburg policy of Counter-Reformation the western part of the country finally returned to Catholicism, while the eastern part has managed to this day to remain strongly Protestant: "although the Habsburg succeeded in re-Catholicising Royal Hungary, east of the Tisza the Reformation remained almost intact in the spirit of peaceful coexistence between the three recognized nations and respect for their diverse creeds".

Rich Protestant Transylvanian Saxon merchants traded with the Ottoman Empire and often donated Anatolian rugs to their churches as a wall decoration more according to their iconoclastic beliefs than the images of the saints used by the Catholics and the Orthodox. Churches like the Black Church of Brașov still hold collections of rugs.

Relations with Persia

At about the same time England also maintained a significant relationship with Persia. In 1616, a trade agreement was reached between Shah Abbas and the East India Company and in 1622 "a joint Anglo-Persian force expelled the Portuguese and Spanish traders from the Persian Gulf" in the Capture of Ormuz.

A group of English adventurers, led by Robert Shirley had a key role in modernizing the Persian army and developing its contacts with the West. In 1624, Robert Shirley led an embassy to England in order to obtain trade agreements.

Later relations

These unique relations between Protestantism and Islam mainly took place during the 16th and 17th century. The ability of Protestant nations to disregard Papal bans, and therefore to establish freer commercial and other types of relations with Muslim and pagan countries, may partly explain their success in developing influence and markets in areas previously discovered by Spain and Portugal. Progressively however, Protestantism became able to consolidate itself and became less dependent on external help. At the same time, the power of the Ottoman Empire waned from its 16th century peak, making attempts at alliance and conciliation less relevant. However, in 1796 the Treaty of Tripoli (between the United States of America and the Subjects of Tripoli of Barbary) noted  "that no pretext arising from religious opinions shall ever produce an interruption of the harmony existing between the two countries."

Eventually, relations between Protestantism and Islam have often tended to become conflicted. Protestant slaves were acquired by Barbary pirates in slave raids on ships and by raids on coastal towns from Ireland to the Netherlands and the southwest of Britain, as far north as Iceland. On some occasions, settlements such as Baltimore in Ireland were abandoned following a raid, only being resettled many years later. Between 1609 and 1616, England alone lost 466 merchant ships to Barbary pirates. In the context of the United States, Protestant missionaries seem to have been active in portraying Islam in an unfavourable light, representing it as "the epitome of anti-Christian darkness and political tyranny", in a way that helped construct in opposition an American national identity as "modern, democratic and Christian". Some famous Protestants have criticized Islam like Pat Robertson

Jerry Falwell, Jerry Vines, R. Albert Mohler, Jr. and Franklin Graham.

Comparative elements
Besides the obvious differences between the two religious, there are also many similarities in their outlooks and attitudes to faith (especially with Sunni Islam), especially in respect to textual criticism, iconoclasm, tendencies to fundamentalism, rejection of marriage as a sacrament, rejection of necessary penance by priests, and the rejection of monastic orders.

Textual criticism
Islam and Protestantism have in common a reliance on textual criticism of the Book. This historical precedence combines to fact that Islam incorporates to a certain extent the Jewish and Christian traditions, recognizing the same God and defining Jesus as a prophet, as well as recognizing Hebrew prophets, thus having a claim to encompassing all the religions of the Book.

Iconoclasm

The rejection of images in worship, although more prominent in Islam, is a common point in Protestantism and Islam. This was already extensively recognized from the earliest times, as in the correspondence between Elizabeth I of England and her Ottoman Empire counterparts, in which she implied that Protestantism was closer to Islam than to Catholicism. This is also a point developed by Martin Luther in On War against the Turk, in which he praised the Ottomans for their rigorous iconoclasm:

Rich Protestant Transylvanian Saxon merchants traded with the Ottoman Empire and often donated Anatolian rugs to their churches as a wall decoration more according to their iconoclastic beliefs than the images of the saints used by the Catholics and the Orthodox. Churches like the Black Church of Brasov still hold collections of such rugs.

Fundamentalism

Islam and Protestantism have in common that they are both based on a direct analysis of the scriptures (the Bible for Protestantism and the Quran for Islam). This can be contrasted to Catholicism in which knowledge is analysed, formalized and distributed by the existing structure of the Church. Islam and Protestantism are thus both based on "a rhetorical commitment to a universal mission", when Catholicism is based on an international structure. This leads to possibilities of fundamentalism, based on the popular reinterpretation of scriptures by radical elements. The term "fundamentalism" was first used in America in the 1920, to describe "the consciously anti-modernist wing of Protestantism".

Islamic and Protestant fundamentalism also tend to be very normative of individuals' behaviours: "Religious fundamentalism in Protestantism and Islam is very concerned with norms surrounding gender, sexuality, and family", although Protestant fundamentalism tends to focus on individual behaviour, whereas Islamic fundamentalism tends to develop laws for the community.

The most notable trend of Islamic fundamentalism, Salafism, is based upon a literal reading of the Qur'an and Sunnah without relying on the interpretations of Muslim philosophers, rejecting the need for Taqlid for recognized scholars. Fundamentalist Protestantism is similar, in that the 'traditions of men' and the Church Fathers are rejected in favor of a literalist interpretation of the Bible, which is seen as inerrant. Islamic Fundamentalists and Protestant Fundamentalists often reject contextual interpretation. Another similarity with Protestantism and Salafism is criticism of saint veneration and belief in the power of relics and tombs, and emphasis on praying to God alone.

Islamic Protestantism
Parallels have regularly been drawn in the similar attitudes of Islam and Protestantism towards the Scriptures. Some trends in Muslim revival have thus been defined as "Islamic Protestantism". In a sense "Islamization is a political movement to combat Westernization using the methods of Western culture, namely a form of Protestantism within Islam itself".

Vitality
Islam and Protestantism share a common vitality in the modern world: "The two most dynamic religious movements in the contemporary world are what can loosely be called popular Protestantism and resurgent Islam", although their approach to civil society is different.

See also
 Islam in England
 Protestantism in Turkey
 Protestantism in Pakistan
 Mormonism and Islam
 Islam and other religions
 Divisions of the world in Islam
 Pallache family
 Protestantism and Judaism
 Schmalkaldic League
 On War Against the Turk

Notes

References

External links
Wittenberg and Mecca issue of Logia: A Journal of Lutheran Theology

Christianity and Islam
Islam